Plumbogummite is a rare secondary lead phosphate mineral, belonging to the alunite supergroup of minerals, crandallite subgroup.  Some other members of this subgroup are:
 Crandallite, CaAl3(PO4)2(OH)5·H2O, where calcium replaces lead
 Goyazite, SrAl3(PO4)2(OH)5·H2O, where strontium replaces lead
 Philipsbornite, PbAl3(AsO4)2(OH)5·H2O, where the arsenate group AsO4 replaces the phosphate group PO4

Plumbogummite was discovered in 1819 and named in 1832 from the Latin "plumbum" for lead, and "gummi" for gum, in allusion to its lead content and appearance, which at times resembles coatings of gum.

Unit cell 
Plumbogummite crystallizes in space group Rm. The reported lattice parameters (the lengths of the sides of the unit cell) vary in detail according to the source, but all agree that normal plumbogummite has "a" close to 7 Å and "c" close to 17 Å, with Z=3.  Various reported values of "a" and "c"are:
a = 7.01 Å, 7.017 Å, 7.018 Å, 7.033 Å
c = 16.71Å, 16.75 Å, 16.784 Å, 16.789 Å
Mills et al. investigated a gallium-rich sample of plumbogummite from Tsumeb, Namibia, and found larger cell parameters, with a = 7.0752 Å and c = 16.818 Å.

Structure 
The basic structural units of plumbogummite are PO4 tetrahedra, with phosphorus atoms (P) at the center and oxygen atoms (O) at the corners, together with AlO6 octahedra, aluminium atoms (Al) at the center and oxygen atoms at the corners.  The tetrahedra and octahedra combine by sharing corners, to form composite layers.  Lead atoms (Pb) occupy sites between the layers.

Environment 
Plumbogummite is found in the oxidized zones of lead-bearing deposits. It commonly occurs as botryoidal, kidney shaped, stalactitic or globular crusts or masses, frequently with a concentric structure; rare crystals have a hexagonal outline. Pyromorphite and baryte are commonly associated minerals, and plumbogummite may be pseudomorphic  after them.  Other associated minerals include mimetite, duftite, cerussite, anglesite and wulfenite.

Occurrence 
The type locality is Huelgoat, Finistère, Brittany, France, and the type material is stored in the Natural History Museum, Paris, France.

Plumbogummite has been found in the Central Cobar Mines, New South Wales, Australia and the Nifty Copper Mine, Western Australia.  Also in the Kintore open cut at Broken Hill, New South Wales, Australia, but it is generally inconspicuous there and only a few specimens have been collected.

Material from the Siglio XX Mine, Llallagua, Bolivia, is an unusual pale yellow color, rather than the more common blue or green, forming crusts on quartz and cassiterite, and enclosing crude octahedral jeanbandyite crystals with orange colored shells of plumbogummite.

References

External links 
 The structure of Plumbogummite

Phosphate minerals
Lead minerals
Trigonal minerals
Minerals in space group 166
Crandallite group